J Yaw Wu (born 14 April 1969) is a Burmese politician who is an Amyotha Hluttaw MP for Kachin State No. 1 constituency. He is a member of the National Unity Party.

Early life and education
J was born on 14 April 1969 in Putao, Kachin State, Myanmar. He is an ethnic Lisu. From 1986 to 1988, he studied at Rangoon Institute of Technology (RIT) for 2nd years. He graduated with BSc (Maths), B.Ab (Psy& Philo) from Myanmar Institute of Theology, Pyin Oo Lwin, and B.Th from Myanmar Institute of Theology, Yangon, and Dip in Therapeutic formation from Philippines.

Political career
He is a member of the National Unity Party. In the 2015 Myanmar general election, he was elected as an Amyotha Hluttaw MP, winning a majority of 13526 votes and elected representative from Kachin State No. 1 parliamentary constituency.

References

Members of the House of Nationalities
1969 births
National Unity Party (Myanmar) politicians
People from Kachin State
Living people